Cynthia Ciurluini, known professionally as Cynthia Dale, is a Canadian television actress and stage performer. She is best known for her role as lawyer Olivia Novak in the 1987–94, and re-booted in 2019, television drama Street Legal.

Biography
Dale was born in Toronto, Ontario, Canada on 11 August 1960 and attended Michael Power/St. Joseph High School. She is the sister of Canadian actress Jennifer Dale and entered the acting world in 1965 after accompanying her sister to an audition. Dale and her sister would appear together in a CBC variety special.

In the 1970s and 1980s, she appeared in a number of movies and stage productions.  She appeared as Patty in the 1981 Canadian slasher film, My Bloody Valentine. She appeared in New York City in an off-Broadway play in 1987, and previously in 1983 first appeared at the Stratford Festival, where she has headlined several shows (mostly musicals) in the 2000s. She starred in the 1985 movie Heavenly Bodies, where she played the owner of an aerobics dance studio.

Since 1998, she has been married to CBC News anchor Peter Mansbridge. They have one child, Will.

She was a member of the judging panel of the Canadian television show Triple Sensation in 2007.

She played Helen Bechdel in the Musical Stage Company's Off Mirvish production of Fun Home at the CAA Theatre from 13 April 2018 to 20 May 2018.

Filmography

Film

Television

References

External links

1961 births
Canadian film actresses
Canadian stage actresses
Canadian television actresses
Participants in Canadian reality television series
Living people
Actresses from Toronto
Canadian women television personalities
20th-century Canadian actresses
21st-century Canadian actresses